Snob is a pejorative term for a person who believes there is a correlation between social status (including physical appearance) and human worth. Snob also refers to a person who feels superiority over those from lower social classes, education levels, or other social areas. The word snobbery came into use for the first time in England during the 1820s.

Examples 

Snobs can through time be found ingratiating themselves with a range of prominent groups – soldiers (Sparta, 400 BCE), bishops (Rome, 1500), poets (Weimar, 1815), farmers (China, 1967) – for the primary interests of snobs is distinction, and as its definition changes, so, naturally and immediately, will the objects of the snob's admiration.

Snobbery existed also in mediaeval feudal aristocratic Europe, when the clothing, manners, language and tastes of every class were strictly codified by customs or law. Geoffrey Chaucer, a poet moving in the court circles, noted the provincial French spoken by the Prioress among the Canterbury pilgrims:
And French she spoke full fair and fetisly
After the school of Stratford atte Bowe,
For French of Paris was to her unknowe.

William Rothwell notes "the simplistic contrast between the 'pure' French of Paris and her 'defective' French of Stratford atte Bowe that would invite disparagement".

Snobbery surfaced more strongly as the structure of the society changed, and the bourgeoisie had the possibility to imitate aristocracy. Snobbery appears when elements of culture are perceived as belonging to an aristocracy or elite, and some people (the snobs) feel that the mere adoption of the fashion and tastes of the elite or aristocracy is sufficient to include someone in the elites, upper classes or aristocracy.

Snob victim
The term "snob" is often misused when describing a "gold-tap owner", i.e. a person who insists on displaying (sometimes non-existent) wealth through conspicuous consumption of luxury goods such as clothes, jewelry, cars etc. Displaying awards or talents in a rude manner, boasting, is a form of snobbery. A popular example of a "snob victim" is the television character Hyacinth Bucket of the BBC comedy series Keeping Up Appearances.

Analysis 
William Hazlitt observed, in a culture where deference to class was accepted as a positive and unifying principle, "Fashion is gentility running away from vulgarity, and afraid of being overtaken by it," adding subversively, "It is a sign the two things are not very far apart." The English novelist Bulwer-Lytton remarked in passing, "Ideas travel upwards, manners downwards." It was not the deeply ingrained and fundamentally accepted idea of "one's betters" that has marked snobbery in traditional European and American culture, but "aping one's betters".

Snobbery is a defensive expression of social insecurity, flourishing most where an establishment has become less than secure in the exercise of its traditional prerogatives, and thus it was more an organizing principle for Thackeray's glimpses of British society in the threatening atmosphere of the 1840s than it was of Hazlitt, writing in the comparative social stability of the 1820s.

Snobbatives
Ghil'ad Zuckermann proposes the term snobbative to refer to a pretentious, highfalutin phrase used by a person in order to sound snobbish. The term derives from snob + -ative, modelled upon comparatives and superlatives. Thus, in its narrow sense, a snobbative is a pompous (phonetic) variant of a word. Consider the following hypercorrect pronunciations in Israeli Hebrew:

khupím is a snobbative of khofím, which means "beaches";
tsorfát is a snobbative of tsarfát, which refers to "France";
amán is a snobbative of omán, which means "artist".

A non-hypercorrect example in Israeli Hebrew is filozófya, a snobbative of filosófya, which means "philosophy". The snobbative filozófya (with z) was inspired by the pronunciation of the Israeli Hebrew word  by German Jewish professors of philosophy, whose speech was characterized by intervocalic voicing of the s as in their German mother tongue.

See also

References

External links

Joseph Epstein, "In a snob-free zone": "Is there a place where one is outside all snobbish concerns—neither wanting to get in anywhere, nor needing to keep anyone else out?"

Etymologies
Ask Oxford – Ask the Experts
Merriam Webster On-line Dictionary
On-line Etymology Dictionary

1820s neologisms
Class discrimination
High society (social class)
Identity politics
Labeling theory
Narcissism
Class-related slurs
Personality traits
 
Social status
Stereotypes of the upper class
Terminology of the University of Cambridge